Silverwood Lake is a large reservoir in San Bernardino County, California, United States, located on the West Fork Mojave River, a tributary of the Mojave River in the San Bernardino Mountains.

Specifications
Silverwood Lake is located on the East Branch of the California Aqueduct.  It is operated by  the California Department of Water Resources and provides a major water source for agencies serving nearby San Bernardino Mountain and Mojave Desert areas. Some  of recreation land surround the lake.

Silverwood Lake State Recreation Area

The Silverwood Lake State Recreation Area is one of many California State Parks features picnicking, hiking trails, swimming beaches, and designated areas for boating, water-skiing and fishing.

The Pacific Crest Trail, "the jewel in the crown of America's scenic trails" spanning  from Mexico to Canada through three western states, passes through the Silverwood Lake State Recreation Area, with trailheads for short or long hikes.

A 2009 California Water Board study found significantly elevated levels of toxic poly-chlorinated biphenyls (PCBS) and mercury levels in largemouth bass at Silverwood Reservoir.

This has prompted local media to express concerns over the large number of anglers keeping and eating fish from this popular Inland Empire lake.

 The California Office of Environmental Health Hazard Assessment (OEHHA) has developed a safe eating advisory for fish caught in the lake based on levels of mercury or PCBs found in local species.

See also
List of dams and reservoirs in California
List of lakes in California
Category: San Bernardino Mountains
Category: Geography of San Bernardino County, California

References

External links

Official Silverwood Lake State Recreation Area website
 Pacific Crest Trail Association website

California State Water Project
Reservoirs in San Bernardino County, California
San Bernardino Mountains
Mojave River
California State Recreation Areas
Parks in San Bernardino County, California
Dams in California
California Department of Water Resources dams
Reservoirs in California
Reservoirs in Southern California
1971 establishments in California